Rory O'Neill (born 16 November 1968), also known by his stage names Panti, Panti Bliss and Pandora Panti Bliss, is a drag queen and gay rights activist from Ballinrobe, County Mayo, Ireland.

Early life 
O'Neill, the son of a veterinary surgeon, grew up in Ballinrobe, County Mayo, and went to art college in Dún Laoghaire. Although raised a Roman Catholic, O'Neill is an atheist. O'Neill talked to Aoibhinn Ní Shúilleabháin about having been diagnosed as HIV-positive in 1995 on the RTÉ Radio 1 series Aoibhinn and Company.

Career 
Panti is considered to be Ireland's foremost drag queen. From 1996 to 2012, Panti was the hostess of the annual Alternative Miss Ireland pageant.

Panti regularly hosts the annual Dublin Pride celebrations, which take place in the month of June every year.

For a number of years Panti hosted a weekly karaoke show, The Casting Couch, at The Front Lounge pub, Dublin. Panti occasionally appears at Shirley Temple Bar's weekly drag queen Bingo show in the Dublin gay bar The George.

On 30 November 2007, he opened the self-titled 'Pantibar' in 7 Capel Street, Dublin. Later, he took over the nearby Pennylane cocktail bar in 2020 at 2 Great Strand Street.

'Panti' is short for 'Pandora Panti Bliss'. Rory O'Neill's first drag performance was in 1998. Panti danced on stage in Japan with Cyndi Lauper during her 1994 Twelve Deadly Cyns Tour. 

In 2023, Panti took part in the sixth series of Dancing with the Stars, partnered with Ukrainian dancer Denys Samson. They finished the competition in 6th place on 5 March.

Incidents

Comments about homophobia on RTÉ (a.k.a. "Pantigate") 

On 11 January 2014, O'Neill appeared on RTÉ's The Saturday Night Show with Brendan O'Connor where they discussed homophobia and O'Neill alleged that some individuals involved in Irish journalism were homophobic. This became known as "Pantigate".

Those mentioned threatened RTÉ and O'Neill with legal action. RTÉ subsequently removed that section of the interview from their online archive.  On 25 January episode of the Saturday Night Show, O'Connor issued a public apology on behalf of RTÉ to those mentioned by O'Neill in the interview held two weeks previously. RTÉ paid €85,000 to those named by O'Neill.

The payouts were later discussed by members of Oireachtas. The incident was also discussed in the European Parliament. with Irish MEP Paul Murphy, calling the payout "a real attack on the freedom of speech" and stating "When John Waters says that gay marriage is ‘a kind of satire’, that is homophobia. When Breda O’Brien says ‘equality must take second place to the common good’, that is homophobia. When the Iona Institute campaign against gay marriage because it is gay marriage, that is homophobia." RTÉ's head of television defended the €85,000 payout stating that it saved RTÉ "an absolute multiple" in the long term.

Noble Call Speech
On 1 February 2014, O'Neill (as Panti) gave a Noble Call speech at the Abbey Theatre in response to the events surrounding the RTÉ controversy, which garnered over 200,000 views in two days.  the video has nearly 1 million views. The speech was described as "the most eloquent Irish speech" in almost 200 years by Fintan O'Toole and garnered the support of Dan Savage RuPaul, Graham Norton, Stephen Fry, Madonna, and others. T-shirts with "I'm on Team Panti" have been sold as a fundraiser for BeLonG To Youth Services, raising over €10,000. In March 2014, English electronic pop duo Pet Shop Boys released the speech, backed with their music, as "Oppressive (The Best Gay Possible)," they followed up with a "slow mix" of the track, and accompanying video with a "montage of homophobia-related clips." O'Neill later donated the dress he wore at the Noble Call to the National Museum of Ireland, where it was put on display about LGBTI+ history in Ireland.

Works

Theatre
 2005 Spurt! Sister! Spurt! as Madame
 2007 In These Shoes?, Written and performed by Panti, at the Dublin Gay Theatre Festival
 2007 All Dolled Up, Written and performed by Panti
 2009  A Woman In Progress, Written and performed by Panti
 2014 High Heels in Low Places, Written and performed by Panti.

Media

Film
 2015 The Queen of Ireland

Television
 1990 Nighthawks as "Seán The Transvestite Farmer"
 1998 The Maury Povich Show,  as Panti (1 episode: "Turn My Daughter Back Into My Son")
 2008 The Clinic as Dusty Mulberry (1 episode)
 2008  Raw as Panti (1 episode)
 2014  The Mario Rosenstock Christmas Special as Panti
 2014 The Saturday Night Show
 2022 The Late Late Eurosong Special as Panti (televote spokesperson)
 2023  Dancing with the Stars

Radio
 2011 Ireland's Karaoke Klassics, 2FM, Co-presenter as Panti with Arveene
 2014 Sunday Breakfast With Dee Reddy, Phantom FM as guest contributor
 2016 Pantisocracy a RTÉ Radio 1 four part interview series hosted by Panti

Music
 2014  "Oppression" by Out!rage Featuring Panti Bliss released in aid of BeLonG To
 2014  "The Best Gay Possible - Oppressive Dance Mix" by Pet Shop Boys incorporates Panti's speech at the Abbey Theatre

Book
 Woman in the Making: A memoir, Rory O'Neill, 2014, Hachette Books Ireland.

Coverage and recognition

Documentary
O'Neill and his alter ego Panti are the subject of a documentary about his early life, the events surrounding comments O'Neill made about homophobia and Panti's role during Ireland's successful campaign for marriage equality. Filmed over a number of years, the documentary was directed by Conor Horgan. The Queen of Ireland premiered on 21 October 2015, followed by its planned nationwide release in Ireland from 23 October 2015.

Awards
 Winner of 'Business Person of the Year' – Gay and Lesbian Awards 2009
 Winner of 'Best Blog Post' – Irish Blog Awards 2010
 Attitude's Editor's Special Award - Attitude Magagzine Awards 2014
 Award for contribution to Irish society - People of the Year Awards 2014
 James Joyce Award - Presented by Literary and Historical society of University College Dublin
 Trinity College Dublin, Honorary Degree  - O'Neill was awarded with an honorary degree from Trinity College Dublin in 2015 for his contribution to LGBT rights and marriage equality

References

External links

Irish drag queens
Irish gay actors
Irish LGBT rights activists
Irish atheists
Living people
People from County Mayo
1968 births
20th-century Irish people
21st-century Irish people